Bracknell Town Football Club is a football club based in Sandhurst, Berkshire, England.

History
The club was established in 1896 as Old Bracknell Wanderers. They joined the Ascot & District League in 1904, and were runners-up in the league in 1907–08. The following season the club won the League Cup, and in 1911–12 they were league champions. Two seasons later they won Division Two. They were league champions again in 1932–33.

In 1949 the club switched to the Reading & District League and were renamed Bracknell Football Club. They remained in the league until joining the Great Western Combination in 1958. In 1962 the club adopted its current name, and a year later joined the Surrey Senior League. They finished bottom of the league in 1965–66, but went on to win the League Cup in 1968–69 and the double of the title and League Cup in 1969–70.

After winning the league, the club joined the Spartan League. They won the League Cup in 1974–75, and when the league merged with the Metropolitan–London League to become the London Spartan League at the end of the season, Bracknell were placed in Division One. They finished as runners-up in the new league's first season, losing the title to Farnborough Town on goal average, as well as losing the League Cup final. In 1977 Division One was renamed the Premier Division, and despite finishing fourth in 1978–79, the club were relegated to the Senior Division. They won the Senior Division in 1980–81, earning promotion back to the Premier Division, and the following season saw them finish as runners-up and win the League Cup. They went on to win the Premier Division and the League Cup in 1982–83.

After being rejected by the Athenian League, Bracknell joined Division Two South of the Isthmian League in 1984. They finished as runners-up in 1985–86 and were promoted to Division One. However, they were relegated back to Division Two South at the end of the 1988–89 season. League reorganisation saw them placed in Division Three in 1991, but after winning the division in 1993–94, they were promoted to Division Two, where they remained until relegation back to Division Three at the end of the 1988–89 season. In 2000–01 the club reached the first round of the FA Cup for the first time, eventually losing 4–0 at Lincoln City.

Further league reorganisation in 2002 saw Bracknell placed in Division One South, and two seasons later they were transferred to Division One West of the Southern League; this became Division One South and West in 2006. After finishing bottom of the division in 2009–10, they were relegated to the Premier Division of the Hellenic League. They were relegated again, this time to Division One East, at the end of the 2011–12 season after finishing bottom of the Premier Division. Despite finishing only fifth in Division One East the following season, the club was promoted back to the Premier Division. The 2016–17 season saw the club win three cups; the Hellenic League Challenge Cup was won by defeating Highworth Town 2–0 in the final; the Berks & Bucks County Senior Trophy was secured with a 2–0 win against Binfield, whilst the club beat Binfield again in the Reading Senior Cup final.

In 2017–18 Bracknell were runners-up in the Hellenic League Premier Division, earning promotion to the South Central Division of the Isthmian League, as well as retaining the Challenge Cup with a 3–1 win over Thatcham Town in the final. The following season saw them finish as runners-up in the Isthmian League's South Central Division, qualifying for the promotion play-offs. After beating Westfield 2–1 in the semi-finals, they lost 3–0 to Cheshunt in the final. In 2021–22 the club won the division, securing the championship by mid-March, earning promotion to the Premier Division South of the Southern League.

The 2022–23 season saw Bracknell qualify for the first round of the FA Cup for the second time, with the club losing 3–0 at home to Ipswich Town.

Ground
The club originally played on a field near the Downshire Arms, before moving to Station Field, a site that later became Ranelagh School. In 1933 they moved to Larges Lane, where the pitch featured a significant slope for the first 20 years of use. After being left money by Raymond Brown, the club was able to build a new clubhouse, which was opened by Stanley Rous.

A seated stand was built behind the dugouts in 1988, with another seated stand and a covered terrace on same touchline. A covered terrace is located behind one goal. In 2016 a 3G pitch was installed and a new stand erected. In 2018, Larges Lane hosted a number of games in the CONIFA World Cup.

At the end of the 2020–21 season the club moved to Sandhurst Town's Bottom Meadow ground.

Honours
Isthmian League
South-Central Division champions 2021–22
Division Three Champions 1993–94
Spartan League
Premier Division champions 1982–83
Senior Division champions 1980–81
League Cup winners 1974–75, 1981–82, 1982–83
Hellenic League
Challenge Cup winners 2016–17, 2017–18
Surrey Senior League
Champions 1969–70
League Cup winners 1968–69, 1969–70
Ascot & District League
Champions 1911–12, 1932–33
Division Two champions 1913–14
League Cup winners 1908–09
Stimulus Cup
Winners 1998–99
Fielden Cup
Winners 1950–51, 1968–69, 1969–70, 1974–75, 1976–77, 1977–78, 1978–79, 1982–83 
Berks & Bucks County Senior Trophy
Winners 2016–17
Reading Senior Cup
Winners 2016–17

Records
Best FA Cup performance: First round, 2000–01, 2022–23
Best FA Trophy performance: Fifth round, 2022–23
Best FA Vase performance: Quarter-finals, 2017–18
Record attendance: 2,500 v Newquay, FA Amateur Cup, 1971
Most appearances: James Woodcock
Most goals: Justin Day

See also
Bracknell Town F.C. players
Bracknell Town F.C. managers

References

External links
Official website

 
Football clubs in England
Football clubs in Berkshire
Association football clubs established in 1896
1896 establishments in England
Sport in Bracknell
Great Western Combination
Surrey Senior League
Spartan League
Isthmian League
Southern Football League clubs
Hellenic Football League